Mendiland is part of the extreme southwest portion of Sierra Leone on the western coast of Africa, where the Mende tribe lives and the Mende language is spoken.  

The slaves who rebelled on the Amistad in 1839 had been kidnapped in Mendiland. After winning their court case, they were eventually returned to their homeland.

Regions of West Africa by country
Geography of Sierra Leone
 
La Amistad